Mike Mastrullo (born 5 May 1957) is an Italian ice hockey player. He competed in the men's tournament at the 1984 Winter Olympics.

References

External links
 

1957 births
Living people
Brown Bears men's ice hockey players
GIJS Groningen players
HC Alleghe players
HC Milano players
HC Varese players
Ice hockey players at the 1984 Winter Olympics
Muskegon Mohawks players
Olympic ice hockey players of Italy
Sportspeople from Lowell, Massachusetts
Ice hockey players from Massachusetts